Perisama bomplandii, or Bomplandi's perisama, is a butterfly belonging to the family Nymphalidae. The species was first described by Félix Édouard Guérin-Méneville in 1844.

Subspecies
 P. b. bomplandii (Colombia, Venezuela)
 P. b. equatorialis (Guénée, 1872) (Ecuador)
 P. b. albipennis Butler, 1873 (Peru, Ecuador)
 P. b. parabomplandii Dognin, 1899 (Colombia)
 P. b. ultramarina Oberthür, 1916 (Ecuador)
 P. b. venezuelana Viette, 1958 (Venezuela)
 P. b. reyi Attal & Crosson du Cormier, 2003 (Venezuela)

Description

These butterflies are the largest of the genus Perisama.

Coloration and pattern of these butterflies are quite variable depending on subspecies. Usually the uppersides of the wings are blue black. The forewings are crossed obliquely from the costal margin to the inner margin by wide bands of golden green or blue. Close to the apex sometimes there is a small white spot. On the uppersides of the hindwings the outer margins are bordered with greenish or blueish. At the base there is a brilliant blue. The underside of the anterior wings is black, with a row of five blue spots, a brown inner margin and a gray base followed by light blue. The apex and the outer margin are gray. The undersides of the posterior wings are whitish or grayish, crossed by two black lines. Larvae feed on Serjania species.

Distribution
This species can be found in Colombia, Ecuador, Peru and Venezuela.

References

External links
 "Species Perisama bomplandii". Butterflies of America.
 "Bomplandi's Perisama (Perisama bomplandii)". Neotropical Butterflies.
 "Perisama bomplandii (Guérin-Méneville, [1844)"]. Insecta.pro.

Biblidinae
Butterflies described in 1844
Nymphalidae of South America